Sarel Francois Oosthuizen (Afrikaans: Rooibul van Krugersdorp, translation: Red bull of Krugersdorp), 22 March 1862 – 14 August 1900)  was a Boer War general. In 1920 he was posthumously awarded the Dekoratie Voor Trouwe Dienst, Anglo-Boeroorlog, 1899-1902 (D.T.D., translation: Decoration for Loyal Service).

Family
Sarel Oosthuizen was the eldest child of Voortrekker Daniel Jacobus Oosthuizen (Prince Albert, South Africa (Albertsburg), 26 July 1821 - Sterkfontein, Krugersdorp, 6 June 1899) and his second wife Anna Susanna du Toit (14 November 1840 - Krugersdorp, 20 September 1921), among in total five sons and three daughters of this couple. Sarel Oosthuizen married Susanna Cornelia Hendrika Johanna Alberts (11 September 1866 - Krugersdorp, 22 June 1950), daughter of Commandant Johannes Joachim Alberts, and had six daughters and three sons by her.

Early career
At a young age he started farming and was called Rooibul van Krugersdorp because of his red hair. He participated in the siege of Pretoria during the First Boer War (1880-1881), in various military operations against indigenous peoples and in the Boer capture of the British invaders of the Jameson Raid (29 December 1895 – 2 January 1896) at Doornkop.

Second Boer War
In 1899 Oosthuizen was elected field cornet (Afrikaans: veldkornet) for his town of Krugersdorp and left with this Commando for the Natal front against the British. He was lightly wounded in the first battle, the Battle of Talana Hill (Battle of Glencoe, Afrikaans: Slag van Talana) on 20 October 1899. Later he joined in the Boer derailing of a British armoured reconnaissance train at Chieveley on 15 November 1899 and apprehended its passenger The Morning Post reporter Winston Churchill, who later erroneously thought that he was arrested by Louis Botha. At the Battle of Colenso on 15 December 1899 Oosthuizen captured ten British cannon. He distinguished himself in the Battle of Spion Kop (Slag van Spioenkop, 23–24 January 1900) and was made a fighting general (Afrikaans: veggeneraal) on 24 February 1900.

After the breakthrough of the British troops in the Biggarsberg hills (10-15 May 1900) Oosthuizen was sent to the south-west of the Transvaal. In the lost Battle of Doornkop near Johannesburg (29 May 1900) Oosthuizen supported general Koos de la Rey in the failed Boer campaign to stop the British advance to Johannesburg and Pretoria in the Klipriviersberg area.
In the aftermath of the fall of Pretoria on 5 June 1900, Oosthuizen and his Krugersdorp men fought in the lost Battle of Diamond Hill (Slag van Donkerhoek, 11–12 June 1900), after which he retreated to his home district of Krugersdorp. President Paul Kruger, who had fled from Pretoria to Machadodorp, encouraged Oosthuizen and others on 20 June by telegram to keep on fighting. However, Oosthuizen died on 14 August 1900 of the wound in his thigh incurred at the Battle of Dwarsvlei near his farm on 11 July 1900, where he had tried in vain to capture the guns of Smith-Dorrien's men.

Decoration
In 1920 Oosthuizen was posthumously awarded the Dekoratie Voor Trouwe Dienst, Anglo-Boeroorlog, 1899-1902 (D.T.D., translation: Decoration for Loyal Service), the so-called "Anglo-Boere Oorlog Medalje" (Anglo-Boer War Medal) by the Union of South Africa Government, together with 590 other Boer military officers from the Second Boer War.

References

Literature
 M. P. Bossenbroek, Yvette Rosenberg (Translator), The Boer War, Seven Stories Press, New York, NY, 2018. , 1609807472. Pages 161 and 274.
 Breytenbach, J. H. Die Geskiedenis van die Tweede Vryheidsoorlog in Suid-Afrika, 1899–1902, Die Staatsdrukker Pretoria, 1969–1996. In Afrikaans.
 volume I. Die Boere-offensief, Okt. - Nov. 1899, Die Staatsdrukker Pretoria, 1969. Pages 371, 379, 478.
 volume II. Die eerste Britse offensief, Nov. - Des. 1899, Die Staatsdrukker Pretoria, 1971. Pages 242, 250, 283, 313, 486–487.
 volume III. Die stryd in Natal, Jan. - Feb. 1900, Die Staatsdrukker Pretoria, 1973. Pages 18, 123, 340, 504, 522, 541, 551.
 volume V. Die Britse Opmars tot in Pretoria, Die Staatsdrukker Pretoria, 1983. Pages 491, 493, 520–522, 524, 528, 535.
 volume VI. Die beleg van Mafeking tot met die Slag van Bergendal, Die Staatsdrukker Pretoria, 1996. Pages 72, 165, 175, 199, 241, 253, 260–263, 266, 290.
 J. E. H. Grobler, The War Reporter: the Anglo-Boer war through the eyes of the burghers, Johannesburg: Jonathan Ball Publishers, 2004. ISBN 978-1-86842-186-2. Pages 13, 15, 23, 46, 58, 72, 79, 82, 85–86. Sarel Oosthuizen should not be confused with Philip Oosthuizen, who is also referred to as "Oosthuizen" by Grobler.

1862 births
1900 deaths
Afrikaner people
South African Republic generals